Ultramarine means "beyond the ocean" and is the name of a color pigment.

Ultramarine, Ultramarines, or Ultra Marines may also refer to:
 Ultra Marines, an introductory board game set in the Warhammer 40,000 universe
 Ultramarine (album), the fourth studio album (2013) by Young Galaxy
 Ultramarine (band), a British electronic and dance band (1989–present)
 Ultramarine (novel), a book by Malcolm Lowry from 1933
 Ultramarine Corps, an Authority-esque superteam in DC Comics
 Ultramarine, a book of poetry by Raymond Carver from 1986
 Ultramarines: A Warhammer 40,000 Movie, a film set in the Warhammer 40,000 universe
 "The Ultramarines", a fictional chapter of Space Marines (Warhammer 40,000)
 Nigritude ultramarine, a search engine optimization contest held in 2004

See also
Overseas (disambiguation)
Outremer
Outre-mer
Ultramar